Michael Cash (born 10 December 1967) is a Bermudian swimmer. He competed in the men's 4 × 100 metre freestyle relay event at the 1992 Summer Olympics.

References

External links
 

1967 births
Living people
Bermudian male swimmers
Olympic swimmers of Bermuda
Swimmers at the 1992 Summer Olympics
Place of birth missing (living people)